Diamond Beach is a coastal town in the Mid North Coast region of New South Wales, Australia, in the Mid-Coast Council LGA, about  north-north-east of Sydney.

At the 2011 census, Diamond Beach had a population of 849 people.

References

Mid North Coast
Suburbs of Mid-Coast Council
Towns in New South Wales